The Cell is a 2000 science fiction psychological thriller film directed by Tarsem Singh in his directorial debut, and starring Jennifer Lopez, Vince Vaughn, and Vincent D'Onofrio. The film follows scientists as they use experimental technology to enter the mind of a comatose serial killer in order to locate where he has hidden his latest kidnap victim.

The film received mixed reviews upon its release, with critics praising the visuals, direction, make-up, costumes and D'Onofrio's performance, while criticizing the plot, an emphasis on style rather than substance, and masochistic creation. Despite the critical reception, the film was a box office success, grossing over $104 million against a $33 million budget, and it earned a nomination for the Academy Award for Best Makeup.

Plot
Child psychologist Catherine Deane is hired to conduct an experimental virtual reality treatment for coma patients: a "Neurological Cartography and Synaptic Transfer System" device managed by doctors Henry West and Miriam Kent that allows her to enter a comatose mind and attempt to coax them into consciousness. The technology is funded by the parents of her patient, Edward Baines, a young boy left comatose by a viral infection that causes an unusual form of schizophrenia. Baines' progress has been hampered by a bogeyman-like alter ego whom Deane avoids. Despite Deane's lack of progress, West and Kent reject Deane's suggestion to reverse the feed to bring Baines into her mind, fearing the consequences of him experiencing an unfamiliar world.

Serial killer Carl Rudolph Stargher traps his victims in a cell in the form of a glass enclosure that slowly fills with water by means of an automatic timer, then uses a hoist in his basement to suspend himself above their bodies while watching the recorded video of their deaths. He succumbs to the same schizophrenic illness and falls into a coma just as the FBI identifies him, leaving them without any leads as to the location of his latest victim, Julia Hickson. After learning of this experimental technology, Agent Peter Novak persuades Deane to enter Stargher's mind and discover Hickson's location.

Deane enters the dark dreamscape of Stargher's twisted psyche, filled with doll-like versions of his victims. Stargher's innocent side manifests as Young Stargher and leads Deane through his memories of abuse he suffered at the hands of his sadistic father. Deane nurtures Young Stargher in hopes of getting Hickson's location but she is thwarted by another manifestation: King Stargher, a demonic idealization of his murderous side that dominates the dreamscape. King Stargher torments Deane until she forgets the world is not real. Dr. West discovers this while monitoring Deane's vitals. He warns that what happens to Deane while she is integrated into Stargher's mindscape will inflict neurological damage on her real body. Novak volunteers to enter Stargher's mind to make Deane remember herself.

Inside Stargher's mind, Novak is captured and subjected to King Stargher's torture while Deane looks on as Stargher's servant. Novak reminds Deane of a painful memory of her younger brother who died after a 6-month coma due to a car accident during her college years to reawaken her awareness that she is in Stargher's mind. Deane breaks free of Stargher's hold and stabs King Stargher to free Novak. During their escape, Novak sees a version of the glass enclosure with the same insignia as the hoist in Stargher's basement. Novak's team discovers that after the hoist's previous owner went bankrupt, the government hired Stargher to seal up his property. Novak races to the property and finds Hickson treading water in the enclosure and breathing through a pipe. Novak breaks the glass wall and rescues Hickson.

Deane, now sympathetic to Young Stargher, locks her colleagues out and reverses the feed of the device to pull Stargher's mind into her own. She presents a comforting paradise to Young Stargher but he knows it is only a temporary reprieve from King Stargher. He shifts to Adult Stargher to relate a childhood story of when he drowned an injured bird as a mercy killing to prevent its torture at his father's hands. King Stargher intrudes as a scaly snake-man but this time, Deane is in control and she beats him to a bloody pulp before impaling him with a sword. However, Young Stargher exhibits the same injuries as King Stargher, and killing either manifestation kills Stargher. Adult Stargher reminds her of the story of the bird and implores her to "save" him. Deane carries Young Stargher into a pool, putting him out of his misery as Stargher dies in the real world.

In the aftermath, Deane and Novak meet outside of Stargher's house. The FBI has officially excluded the mind technology from their inquiry and Deane has gotten approval to use the reverse feed on Edward Baines. The final scene is of Baines walking to embrace Deane inside the paradise of Deane's mindscape.

Cast

Production
Director Tarsem Singh asked Tara Subkoff, during her interview, if she could swim, to which she responded that she could and that she had been a lifeguard. It turned out that she could not go underwater without holding her nose. Singh would have switched her role with Catherine Sutherland, but it was too late and there was not enough money or time to re-shoot.

The scene where the Special Agents are trying to convince Dr. Catherine Deane to enter the killer's mind was recorded at the Barcelona Pavilion in Barcelona, Spain.

Artistic influences
Some of the scenes in The Cell are inspired by works of art. A scene in which a horse is split into sections by falling glass panels was inspired by the works of British artist Damien Hirst. The film also includes scenes based on the work of other late 20th century artists, including Odd Nerdrum, H. R. Giger and the Brothers Quay. Tarsem—who began his career directing music videos such as En Vogue's "Hold On" and R.E.M.'s "Losing My Religion"—drew upon such imagery for Stargher's dream sequences. In particular, he was influenced by videos directed by Mark Romanek, such as "Closer" and "The Perfect Drug" by Nine Inch Nails, "Bedtime Story" by Madonna, and the many videos that Floria Sigismondi directed for Marilyn Manson. During a scene, Jennifer Lopez falls asleep watching a film; the film is Fantastic Planet.

In the scene where Catherine talks with Carl while he is "cleaning" his first victim, the scenery resembles the music video "Losing My Religion" by R.E.M. The scene where Peter Novak first enters the mind of Carl Stargher, and is confronted by three women with open mouths to the sky is based on the painting Dawn by Norwegian painter Odd Nerdrum. The scene when Catherine Deane is chasing Carl through a stone hallway, right before she enters the room with the horse, is based on a painting by H. R. Giger called "Schacht".

A psychiatrist entering the dreams of an insane patient in order to take control of the dreams and so to cure the patient's mind (this being a very risky attempt, because the insanity may prevail during such "neuro-participatory therapy") was described in the novella He Who Shapes (1965) by Roger Zelazny, but the film Dreamscape (1984), subsequently developed from Zelazny's basic idea, had a completely different plot.

Reception
Critical reaction to The Cell has been mixed, with a score of 45% on Rotten Tomatoes based on 165 reviews, and an average rating of 5.6/10  with the site's consensus reporting that "The Cell offers disturbing, stunning eye candy, but its visual pleasures are no match for a confused storyline that undermines the movie's inventive aesthetic." Metacritic assigned the film a weighted average score of 40 out of 100, based on 32 critics, indicating "mixed or average reviews". Audiences surveyed by CinemaScore gave the film a grade "C+" on scale of A to F.

One of the most positive reviews came from Roger Ebert, who awarded the film four stars out of four, writing: "For all of its visual pyrotechnics, it's also a story where we care about the characters; there's a lot at stake at the end, and we're involved. I know people who hate it, finding it pretentious or unrestrained; I think it's one of the best films of the year." Ebert later placed the film on his list of "The Best 10 Movies of 2000", writing: "Tarsem, the director, is a visual virtuoso who juggles his storylines effortlessly; it's dazzling, the way he blends so many notes, styles and genres into a film so original." James Berardinelli gave the film three stars out of four, writing: "The Cell becomes the first serial killer feature in a long time to take the genre in a new direction. Not only does it defy formulaic expectations, but it challenges the viewer to think and consider the horrors that can turn an ordinary child into an inhuman monster. There are no easy answers, and The Cell doesn't pretend to offer any. Instead, Singh presents audiences with the opportunity to go on a harrowing journey. For those who are up to the challenge, it's worth spending time in The Cell." Peter Travers from Rolling Stone wrote that "Tarsem uses the dramatically shallow plot to create a dream world densely packed with images of beauty and terror that cling to the memory even if you don't want them to."

Conversely, Stephen Hunter of The Washington Post called it "contrived", "arbitrary", and "overdrawn". Slates David Edelstein panned the film as well, writing: "When I go to a serial-killer flick, I don't want to see the serial killer (or even his inner child) coddled and empathized with and forgiven. I want to see him shot, stabbed, impaled, eviscerated, and finally engulfed—shrieking—in flames. The Cell serves up some of the most gruesomely misogynistic imagery in years, then ends with a bid for understanding." Jonathan Rosenbaum of the Chicago Reader remarked, "There's almost no plot here and even less character—just a lot of pretexts for S&M imagery, Catholic decor, gobs of gore, and the usual designer schizophrenia." Empire Magazine gave the film two stars out of five, stating that "at times beautiful and always disturbing, this is strangely devoid of meaning."

Accolades

Sequel

A sequel was released direct to DVD on June 16, 2009. The story centers on The Cusp, a serial killer who murders his victims, and then brings them back to life, over and over again until they beg to die. Maya (Tessie Santiago) is a psychic investigator and surviving victim of The Cusp, whose abilities developed after spending a year in a coma.  Maya must use her powers to travel into the mind of the killer unprotected, in order to save his latest victim.

See also
Dreamscape (1984 film)
Paperhouse (film)

References

External links
 
 
 
 
 

2000 films
2000 directorial debut films
2000 horror films
2000 psychological thriller films
2000 science fiction films
2000s American films
2000s English-language films
2000s German films
2000s horror thriller films
2000s psychological horror films
2000s science fiction horror films
2000s science fiction thriller films
2000s serial killer films
American horror thriller films
American psychological horror films
American psychological thriller films
American science fiction horror films
American science fiction thriller films
American serial killer films
BDSM in films
English-language German films
Films about child abuse
Films about nightmares
Films about telepresence
Films directed by Tarsem Singh
Films scored by Howard Shore
Films shot in Namibia
Films with underwater settings
German horror thriller films
German psychological thriller films
German science fiction horror films
German science fiction thriller films
German serial killer films
New Line Cinema films